Parliamentary elections were held in Guinea on 11 June 1995. The first multi-party elections for the National Assembly since independence, they saw 21 parties field 846 candidates for the 114 seats, divided between 38 single-member constituencies and 76 based on proportional representation, although they were boycotted by the Union of Democratic Forces. The result was a victory for the Unity and Progress Party, which won 71 of the 114 seats. Voter turnout was 61.9%.

Results

References

Elections in Guinea
Guinea
1995 in Guinea
Election and referendum articles with incomplete results